Beriz (also Romanized as Berīz; also known as Behri and Beri) is a village in Dehkuyeh Rural District, in the Central District of Larestan County, Fars Province, Iran. At the 2006 census, its population was 2,146, in 411 families.

References 
3. Les Six Voyages de Jean Baptiste Tavernier, Ecuyer, Baron d’Aubonne, en Turquie, en Perse, et aux Indes. Chez Olivier               de.Varennes, 1st ed. Paris 1675.

Populated places in Larestan County